Team News Corp (also Challenge of Netsurvey, Team Elanders) is an Australian Volvo Ocean 60 yacht. She competed in the 2001–02 Volvo Ocean Race and finished 5th skippered by Jez Fanstone.

References

Sailing yachts of Australia
Volvo Ocean 60 yachts
Volvo Ocean Race yachts
Sydney to Hobart Yacht Race yachts
2000s sailing yachts
Sailing yachts of Sweden